In Greek mythology, King Laius (pronounced ), or Laios of Thebes was a key personage in the Theban founding myth.

Family 
Laius was the son of Labdacus. He was the father, by  Jocasta, of Oedipus, who killed him.

Mythology

Abduction of Chrysippus
After the death of his father Labdacus, Laius was raised by the regent Lycus but Amphion and Zethus usurped the throne of Thebes. Some Thebans, wishing to see the line of Cadmus continue, smuggled the young Laius out of the city before their attack, in which they killed Lycus and took the throne.  Laius was welcomed by Pelops, king of Pisa in the Peloponnesus. According to some sources, Laius abducted and raped the king's son, Chrysippus, and carried him off to Thebes while teaching him how to drive a chariot, or as Hyginus records it, during the Nemean Games. Because of this, Laius is considered by many to be the originator of pederastic love, and the first pederastic rapist.

This abduction is thought to be the subject of one of the lost tragedies of Euripides. With both Amphion and Zethus having died in his absence, Laius became king of Thebes upon his return.

Later misfortunes 

After the rape of Chrysippus, Laius married Jocasta, the daughter of Menoeceus, a descendant of the Spartoi. Laius received an oracle from Delphi which told him that he must not have a child, or the child would kill him and marry his wife; in another version, recorded by Aeschylus, Laius is warned that he can save the city only if he dies childless. One night, however, Laius was drunk and fathered Oedipus with Jocasta. On Laius' orders, the baby, Oedipus, was exposed on Mount Cithaeron with his feet bound (or perhaps staked to the ground), but he was taken by a shepherd, who did not have the resources to look after him, so he was given to King Polybus and Queen Merope (or Periboea) of Corinth, who raised him to adulthood.

When Oedipus desired to know more about his parentage, he consulted the Delphic Oracle, only to be told that he must not go to his home or he would kill his father and marry his mother. Thinking that he was from Corinth, he set out toward Thebes to avoid this fate.  At the road called 'Cleft Way,' he met Laius, who was going to Delphi to consult the oracle because he had received omens indicating that his son might return to kill him. Oedipus refused to defer to the king, although Laius' attendants ordered him to. Being angered, Laius either rolled a chariot wheel over his foot or hit him with his whip, and Oedipus killed Laius and all but one of his attendants, who claimed it was a gang of men. Laius was buried where he died by Damasistratus, the king of Plataea. Later, Thebes was cursed with a disease because Laius' murderer had not been punished.

Many of Laius' descendants met with ill fortune, but whether this was because he violated the laws of hospitality and marriage by carrying off his host's son and raping him, or because he ignored the Oracle's warning not to have children, or some combination of these, is not clear. Another theory is that the entire line of Cadmus was cursed, either by Ares when Cadmus killed his serpent, or else by Hephaestus who resented the fact that Cadmus married Harmonia, the daughter of Ares and Aphrodite, Hephaestus' straying wife. Certainly, many of Cadmus' descendants had tragic ends.

See also
Laius complex

Notes

References 
Apollodorus, The Library with an English Translation by Sir James George Frazer, F.B.A., F.R.S. in 2 Volumes, Cambridge, MA, Harvard University Press; London, William Heinemann Ltd. 1921. ISBN 0-674-99135-4. Online version at the Perseus Digital Library. Greek text available from the same website.

Pausanias, Description of Greece with an English Translation by W.H.S. Jones, Litt.D., and H.A. Ormerod, M.A., in 4 Volumes. Cambridge, MA, Harvard University Press; London, William Heinemann Ltd. 1918. . Online version at the Perseus Digital Library
Pausanias, Graeciae Descriptio. 3 vols. Leipzig, Teubner. 1903.  Greek text available at the Perseus Digital Library.

 

Theban kings
Kings in Greek mythology
Mythological rapists
Theban characters in Greek mythology
LGBT themes in Greek mythology